Kou (Kow), or Sinsauru, is a Rai Coast language spoken in Madang Province, Papua New Guinea. The putative "Asas" language is just the Kou spoken in Asas village.

References

Rai Coast languages
Languages of Madang Province